XHCTO-FM is a radio station on 93.1 FM in Torreón, Coahuila. The station is owned by Multimedios Radio and carries a pop format known as Hits FM.

History
XHCTO received its concession on May 19, 1992. It was owned by Sintonía Fina, S.A. de C.V., and licensed across the state line to Gómez Palacio, Durango. In 2001, the concession was transferred to Multimedios Radio.

References

Radio stations in Coahuila
Radio stations in the Comarca Lagunera
Multimedios Radio